The cabinet of Alexandru Marghiloman was the government of Romania from 5 March to 23 October 1918.

Ministers
The ministers of the cabinet were as follows:

President of the Council of Ministers:
Alexandru Marghiloman (5 March - 23 October 1918)
Vice President of the Council of Ministers:
Constantin C. Arion (4 June - 23 October 1918)
Minister of the Interior: 
Alexandru Marghiloman (5 March - 23 October 1918)
Minister of Foreign Affairs: 
Constantin C. Arion (5 March - 23 October 1918)
Minister of Finance:
Mihai Seulescu (5 March - 23 October 1918)
Minister of Justice:
Dimitrie Dobrescu (5 March - 4 June 1918)
Ion Mitilineu (4 June - 23 October 1918)
Minister of Religious Affairs and Public Instruction:
Simion Mehedinți (5 March - 23 October 1918)
Minister of War:
Gen. Constantin Hârjeu (5 March - 23 October 1918)
Minister of Public Works:
(interim) Gen. Constantin Hârjeu (5 - 25 March 1918)
Nicolae Ghica-Comănești (25 March - 23 October 1918)
Minister of Industry and Commerce:
Constantin Meissner (5 March - 4 June 1918)
Grigore G. Cantacuzino (4 June - 23 October 1918)
Minister of Agriculture and Property:
(interim) Alexandru Marghiloman (5 March - 4 June 1918)
Constantin Garoflid (4 June - 23 October 1918)

Ministers without portfolio (for Bessarabia):
Ion Inculeț (9 April - 23 October 1918)
Daniel Ciugureanu (9 April - 23 October 1918)

References

Cabinets of Romania
Cabinets established in 1918
Cabinets disestablished in 1918
1918 establishments in Romania
1918 disestablishments in Romania
Romania in World War I